A streaming channel is a television channel available for free on most internet-connected smart TV devices. In contrast to the cable television or satellite television business models, where users pay for a subscription, these channels are only supported by ads or deals with device makers. These channels may play any kind of TV content, including news.

In the United States

Streaming news channels 
In the United States, some of today's large legacy network media companies offer a streaming news channel, such as ABC News Live, CBS News Live, NBC News Now, and Live Now on Fox.    

Smaller channels are available too, from some from less traditional companies like Yahoo Finance, USA Today, Newsmax, Real America's Voice, TYT, or more for more niche audiences like Today All Day (an NBC News property) and NBCLX.   

Local news channels for dozens of media markets in the US are also available for viewing outside their normal local markets.

Other countries

Platforms for streaming channels 

 Samsung TV
 Roku TV
 Sony 
 Panasonic 
 LG

See also 

 Streaming media

References